Esko Kovero (born 18 February 1958, in Kuusjärvi) is a Finnish actor. He is best known as Ismo Laitela in the Finnish soap opera Salatut elämät (1999–), but he has also appeared in movies and the theatre.

Kovero graduated from the Helsinki Theatre Academy in 1983.

Filmography 
 Kiljusen Herrasväki - Police (1981)
 Sadetanssi (1983)
 Talvisota - Juho Pernaa (1989)
 Enkelipeli (1986)
 Elämän suola - Markku Pohjonen (1 episode, 1996)
 Salatut elämät (1999–) – Ismo Laitela (1999–present)
 Pako punaisten päämajasta - Haapalainen (2000)
 Thilia Thalia (2 episodes, 2002)
 Leikin varjolla (1 episode, 2006)
 Satula - Jorma (Salatut elämät spinoff - Web Series) (2015)

References 

1958 births
Living people
People from Outokumpu
Members of the Orthodox Church of Finland
Finnish male actors